The India Club is a social and dining club on the Strand in London, England. Established in 1951 under the leadership of Krishna Menon, its founding members include Lady Mountbatten and Jawaharlal Nehru.

History
Today the space is no longer a members' club and is open to all. The building has retained original colonial features from the time of occupation by the India League. It is the only building in London connected to the India League which has been neither re-developed nor re-purposed. Portraits and photographs of famous historical figures from the Indian independence movement adorn the walls.

The National Trust staged an exhibition about the venue's history in 2019.

Proposed demolition
In September 2017 plans were submitted to Westminster City Council for the building to be partially demolished, replacing the India Club with en-suite hotel bedrooms. This would have required the closure of the India Club. A petition to save the club reached over 26,000 signatures, leading the council to reject the redevelopment plans.

Its preservation is an enduring symbol of Indo-British friendship.

References

Further reading
 Last stand for Strand club where India’s past has stood still, The Guardian, 20 May 2018.

External links
 India Club Restaurant, Hotel Strand Continental

1951 establishments in England
1951 establishments in the United Kingdom
clubs and societies in London